Charles Martin (1884–1934) was a French artist and illustrator.

His illustrated books include Les Modes en 1912, a hat collection; the erotic Mascarades et Amusettes and Sports et divertissements (published 1923), a collaboration with composer Erik Satie.

References

External links
Welcome to Courtauld Images at www.courtauldimages.com

French illustrators
1884 births
1934 deaths
Fashion illustrators